Charles Jacob Brock (March 15, 1916 – May 25, 1987) was an American football center and linebacker.

External links

1916 births
1987 deaths
American football centers
Players of American football from Nebraska
Nebraska Cornhuskers football players
Green Bay Packers players
People from Columbus, Nebraska